Mirza Ali Asghar Khan (6 January 1858 – 31 August 1907), also known by his honorific titles of Amin al-Soltan and Atabak, was the last prime minister of Iran under Naser al-Din Shah Qajar.

Early life 
Ali Asghar was born on 6 January 1858. He was the second son of Agha Ebrahim, an influential court minister of  Georgian origin. When Ali Asghar was 15 years old, he began helping his father in politics. The next year, Ali Asghar and his father accompanied Naser al-Din Shah to his pilgrimage to the holy Shi'a cities of Najaf, Karbala, Kadhimiya, and Samarra.

When Ali Asghar returned to his native Tehran, he was promoted to commander of the royal escort cavalry, and in the following years continued to rise to higher offices, eventually being promoted to the treasurer of the army. After the death of his father in 1883, he received the latter's honorific title "Amin al-Soltan" and became the Justice Minister. A few years later he received the title of "Atabak" and took over the post of Prime Minister.

Exile and return 
After Naser's assassination in 1896, Ali Asghar helped by securing the throne and its secure transfer to his son, Mozaffar al-Din Shah Qajar. In November 1896, Ali Asghar was dismissed from his prime minister office by Mozaffar ad-Din Shah Qajar. Ali Asghar then initially retired to Qom, later traveled through Russia to China and Japan, and then emigrated to Switzerland. During the Iranian Constitutional Revolution, the new Qajar king Mohammad Ali Shah Qajar invited Ali Asghar back to Iran.

Although Ali Asghar had many who opposed him, he also had supporters in major Iranian cities such as Qazvin, Rasht, and his native Tehran. He was shortly appointed by Mohammad Ali Shah as the Prime Minister of Iran. At the time of Ali Asghar's re-appointment as prime minister, Iran was in chaos: the state owed money to the people who served them; British-Russian rivalry over Iran; Ottoman incursions on the west Iranian borders; and devastating rebellions. Ali Asghar managed to quickly stop the Ottomans, and also tried to make stability fix the financial problems in Iran.

Ali Asghar was assassinated in the front of the Iranian Parliament on 31 August 1907.

See also
Pahlavi dynasty
List of prime ministers of Iran

References

Sources 
 Rahimi, MalekMohammad. Gorji haye Iran. Esfahan: Yekta, (2000). (The Georgians of Iran)
 Cyrus Ghani: Iran and the rise of Reza Shah. From Qajar collapse to Pahlavi rule. I. B. Tauris, London u. a. 1998, S. 78.
 

1858 births
1907 deaths
Iranian people of Georgian descent
Politicians from Tehran
Prime Ministers of Iran
People of the Persian Constitutional Revolution
Assassinated Iranian politicians
19th-century Iranian politicians
20th-century Iranian politicians
Members of the 1st Iranian Majlis
Honorary Knights Grand Cross of the Order of the Bath
People of Qajar Iran